Balanfodougou is a village in north-eastern Ivory Coast. It is in the sub-prefecture of Tougbo, Téhini Department, Bounkani Region, Zanzan District. It lies 4 kilometers north of the Komoé River.

Notes

Populated places in Zanzan District
Populated places in Bounkani